Maximin de Bompart, Marquis de Bompard (1698–1773) was a French naval officer and colonial administrator who served as governor general of the French Antilles between 1750 and 1757. In 1759 he led a French naval force attempting to relieve Guadeloupe which was under attack from British forces during the Seven Years' War. However he landed on Guadeloupe too late to save the island which had formally surrendered on 1 May 1759. Reluctantly Bompart was forced to withdraw and acknowledge British occupation of the island.

See also
 France in the Seven Years' War
 Great Britain in the Seven Years' War

References

Bibliography
 Anderson, Fred Crucible of War, Faber and Faber, 2000
 McLynn, Frank 1759: The Year Britain Became Master of the World, Pimlico, 2005

1698 births
1773 deaths
French military personnel of the Seven Years' War
Governors general of the French Antilles